Cowra was an electoral district of the Legislative Assembly in the Australian state of New South Wales from 1894 to 1904.


Election results

Elections in the 1900s

1901

Elections in the 1890s

1898

1896 by-election

1895

1894

References

New South Wales state electoral results by district